The men's lightweight is a competition featured at the 2015 World Taekwondo Championships, and was held at the Traktor Ice Arena in Chelyabinsk, Russia on May 13 and May 14. Lightweights were limited to a maximum of 74 kilograms in body mass.

Medalists

Results
Legend
DQ — Won by disqualification

Finals

Top half

Section 1

Section 2

Section 3

Section 4

Bottom half

Section 5

Section 6

Section 7

Section 8

References
Draw
Results

External links
Official website

Men's 74